Spanos is a surname of Greek origin. Notable people with the surname include:

 Alex Spanos (1923-2018), American owner of the San Diego Chargers
 Anthony Spanos (born 1995), Australian actor
 Danny Spanos, American musician
 Dean Spanos (born 1950), American president and CEO of the Los Angeles Chargers
 Giannis Spanos (1934-2019), Greek musician
 John Spanos (born 1961), Australian soccer player
 Lou Spanos (born 1971), American football coach
 Matt Spanos (born 1984), American football player
 Nicholas Spanos (1942-1994), American/Canadian psychology professor
 Peter Spanos (born 1948), American attorney at law
 Nick Spanos (died 1990), Australian murder victim
 Vasili Spanos (born 1981), American baseball player
 William V. Spanos (1924-2017), American literature

See also
 Spano (disambiguation)

Greek-language surnames